Elm Grove is an unincorporated community in Cherokee County, in the U.S. state of Texas. According to the Handbook of Texas, the community had a population of 50 in 2000. It is located within the Tyler-Jacksonville Micropolitan area.

History
Elm Grove was founded sometime before 1900. The community had several stores, three churches, and several homes in the mid-1930s. Many residents left the area, but all three churches and two stores remained in the late 1980s. Its population was 50 in 2000.

Geography

Education
Elm Grove had a school in the mid-1930s, which remained in the late 1980s. Today the community is served by the Rusk Independent School District.

References

Unincorporated communities in Cherokee County, Texas
Unincorporated communities in Texas